Carsten-Pieter Zimmermann (born March 26, 1978 in Vienna) is an Austrian news anchor. Known through his work at the TV station PULS 4 (former Puls TV)  and Forbes Magazine.

Career 
2006 Zimmermann started presenting the news as a journalist at Puls TV, after being the newsliner at Radio Max and education at Austrian Broadcasting Corporation ORF and the University of California, Los Angeles (UCLA) (Professional Program In Producing an der School Of Theater, Film And Television).

2012 he continued at the primetime show AustriaNews (PULS 4 News) at ProSieben Austria, Sat.1 Österreich and the Café Puls morning show.

Personal life 
Carsten-Pieter Zimmermann is the brother of Marie-Claire Zimmermann, news anchor at Austrian Broadcasting's news program Zeit im Bild.

External links 
 Homepage von Carsten-Pieter Zimmermann
 PULS 4 AustriaNews
 Artikel über Ägypten, Altkalksburger Rundschreiben
 Zimmermann live in Café Puls, Nationalratswahl, TV
 Carsten-Pieter Zimmermannn in Forbes Magazine

References 

1978 births
Living people
Mass media people from Vienna